Dennis Darrell Roady (born June 6, 1983) is an American YouTube personality best known for his Internet-posted pranks and his association with YouTubers Roman Atwood and Vitaly Zdorovetskiy, leading to starring in the feature film Natural Born Pranksters.  He hosts the YouTube channels Dennis Roady Deeds and howtoPRANKitup.  He is a cast member of the web series Fight of the Living Dead: Experiment 88, in which 10 Youtubers are placed in a zombie apocalypse scenario. Prior to YouTube, Roady served in the U.S. Army for 10 years.

Filmography

Television

Film

References

External links 
 

1983 births
Living people
American YouTubers
American male comedians
Male actors from Cincinnati
Video bloggers
Comedians from Ohio
21st-century American male actors
American male film actors
People from Wiesbaden
American male television actors
German emigrants to the United States
American male web series actors
21st-century American comedians
Male bloggers
Prank YouTubers